The 2021 NAPA Auto Parts Colorado 150 was a ARCA Menards Series West race held on July 31, 2021. It was contested over 150 laps on the  short track oval. It was the fourth race of the 2021 ARCA Menards Series West season. David Gilliland Racing driver Joey Iest, collected his first career ARCA Menards Series West win.

Background

Entry list 

 (R) denotes rookie driver.
 (i) denotes driver who is ineligible for series driver points.

Practice/Qualifying 
Practice and qualifying were combined into 75 minute long session, where the fastest recorded lap counts as a qualifying lap. However, this session was rained out, awarding the pole to Todd Souza based on points.

Starting Lineups

Race

Race results

References 

2021 in sports in Colorado
NAPA Auto Parts Colorado 150
2021 ARCA Menards Series West